The name Iselle has been used for six tropical cyclones in the Eastern Pacific Ocean.
 Hurricane Iselle (1984)
 Hurricane Iselle (1990)
 Tropical Storm Iselle (2002)
 Tropical Storm Iselle (2008) – no threat to land.
 Hurricane Iselle (2014) – a Category 4 hurricane that made landfall on the Big Island of Hawaii as a tropical storm.
 Tropical Storm Iselle (2020) – stayed in the open ocean.

See also
 Hurricane Isbell – a similar name which was used once in the Atlantic. 

Pacific hurricane set index articles